Hellinsia huayna is a moth of the family Pterophoridae. It is found in Ecuador.

The wingspan is 15 mm. The forewings are ochreous brown-grey and the markings are dark brown. The hindwings and fringes are brown-grey. Adults are on wing in September and October, at an altitude of 1,700 meters.

Etymology
The species is named after Huayna Capac, the son of Inca leader Tupac-Yupanqui.

References

Moths described in 2011
huayna
Moths of South America